Mount Edwards may refer to:

Australia 

 Mount Edwards (Queensland), a mountain
 Mount Edwards, Queensland, the locality surrounding the mountain
 Mount Edwards railway line, a former railway line that terminated at Mount Edwards

United States 
 Mount Edwards (Colorado) in Colorado, USA

See also:
 Mount King Edward